The Black Hawk Hotel is an historic building located in downtown Cedar Falls, Iowa, United States. It was individually listed on the National Register of Historic Places in 2002. In 2017 it was included as a contributing property in the Cedar Falls Downtown Historic District.

History
A hotel has occupied the same site in Cedar Falls since the early 1850s. The hotels have occupied two different buildings and had several names over the years. The Winslow House was a wood frame stagecoach hotel that was built c. 1853. It was renamed the Western in 1858, and an additional floor was added to the building. In the 1860s the hotel was renamed the Carter House.

In the late 1870s, the present Second Empire building was built and named the Davis House. The ownership of the hotel transferred to the Burr family in 1885 and it was renamed Burr's Hotel.

Waterloo architect John G. Ralston was hired by a group of investors in 1914 to redesign the hotel building. The renovation made the structure a combination of the Second Empire and Mission styles. It was at this time that the hotel was named the Blackhawk.

References

External links
The Blackhawk Hotel Website

Hotel buildings completed in 1915
Buildings and structures in Cedar Falls, Iowa
Second Empire architecture in Iowa
National Register of Historic Places in Black Hawk County, Iowa
Hotel buildings on the National Register of Historic Places in Iowa
Hotels in Iowa
Individually listed contributing properties to historic districts on the National Register in Iowa